The Hirshey Mine was one of the major gold mines in the northern mountains of the Kenai Peninsula in south-central Alaska in the first half of the 20th century. The claim was staked in 1911 John Hirshey, who arrived in the area in 1895 and was one of the early settlers of Hope. He called the claim his "Lucky Strike", and it was worked until all mines were closed in the area in 1942. When the area was listed on the National Register of Historic Places in 1978, remnants of two buildings survived, along with the entrance to one of the tunnels and discarded equipment.

The mine was listed on the National Register of Historic Places in 1978.

See also
National Register of Historic Places listings in Kenai Peninsula Borough, Alaska

References

1911 establishments in Alaska
1942 disestablishments in Alaska
Archaeological sites on the National Register of Historic Places in Alaska
Buildings and structures completed in 1911
Gold mining in Alaska
Mines in Alaska
National Register of Historic Places in Kenai Peninsula Borough, Alaska